Metz Township may refer to:

Metz Township, Michigan
Metz Township, Vernon County, Missouri